The Last of the Clintons is a 1935 American western film directed by Harry L. Fraser and starring Harry Carey, Betty Mack and Victor Potel. It was the last film released by the Poverty Row studio Ajax Pictures before it closed down.

Synopsis
Adventurer Trigger Carson unexpectedly comes across gold prospector Jed, the last of the Clintons, and assists him in his battle against a local gang of cattle rustlers.

Cast
 Harry Carey as Trigger Carson
 Betty Mack as Edith Elkins
 Del Gordon as Marty Todd
 Victor Potel as 	Jed Clinton
 Earl Dwire as Pete - Henchman
 Ruth Findlay as	Lorrie
 Tom London as 	Luke Todd
 Slim Whitaker as Jim Elkins
 William McCall as 	Ed Carney
 Allen Greer	as	Frank Smith
 Lafe McKee as Sam Slater 
 Pat Harmon as 	Lefty 
 Lew Meehan as Bartender 
 Tex Palmer as 	Henchman
 Barney Beasley as 	Barfly

References

Bibliography
 Pitts, Michael R. Poverty Row Studios, 1929–1940. McFarland & Company, 2005.

External links
 

1935 films
1935 Western (genre) films
American Western (genre) films
Films directed by Harry L. Fraser
American black-and-white films
1930s English-language films
1930s American films